Vicente Rojo Almazán (15 March 1932 – 17 March 2021) was a Spanish-Mexican painter, graphic designer, and sculptor.

His daughter, Alba Rojo Cama (1961–2016), also became an artist, known for her mathematical sculpture.

See also
 País de volcanes

References

1932 births
2021 deaths
Mexican painters
Mexican graphic designers
Mexican sculptors
Male sculptors
Place of birth missing